Alexander Antonovich Rizzoni, or Alessandro Rizzoni (4 February 1836, in Riga – 29 April 1902, in Rome) was a Russian-Italian painter of portraits and genre scenes; mostly on Catholic themes.

Biography
He was born to an Italian family of artisans; originally from Bologna. He received his first lessons from his brother Pavel, who was also an artist. In 1852, he enrolled at the Imperial Academy of Arts, where he studied with Bogdan Willewalde. Five years later, he was awarded two silver medals for his work.

That same year, he made a study trip to Italy and France, at his own expense. When he returned in 1860, he received a gold medal for his painting "Jewish Smugglers", which might now be perceived as somewhat Anti-Semitic although, judging by his later works, he harbored no such sentiment.

After that, he travelled again, to Spain and Belgium and, when he returned in 1862, received another gold medal along with a stipend that allowed him to continue his studies abroad.

He spent four years in Paris and Rome, where he painted portraits of the Catholic clergy, scenes from folk life, and interiors of church buildings and synagogues. In 1866, he showed eight of these paintings in Saint Petersburg, earning the title of "Academician" and an extension of his stipend. Two years later, he showed more works and was named a Professor.

When his stipend expired, he chose to stay in Rome, but continued to exhibit in Saint Petersburg. He also helped acquire paintings for the Tretyakov Gallery and the collector,  Bogdan Khanenko. From this point on, his works dealt almost exclusively with the Catholic Church; plus some portraits of young women. His paintings are notable for their attention to details in the environment and costume, but are considered somewhat sentimental. Non-Catholic commentators in Russia were also concerned with his lack of "critical detachment". 

After that, and some similar follow-up criticisms, he fell into a depression and committed suicide the following year.

In 1990, one of his paintings, "The Italian Shop", was among a dozen stolen from the Serpukhov Historical and Art Museum. It was recovered in 2010, after being found in a private collection.

References

External links 

ArtNet: More works by Rizzoni

1836 births
1902 deaths
19th-century painters from the Russian Empire
Russian male painters
Russian genre painters
Russian portrait painters
Russian emigrants to Italy
Painters who committed suicide
Artists from Riga
Russian people of Italian descent
19th-century male artists from the Russian Empire
1902 suicides
Suicides in Italy